The Western Australian Academy of Performing Arts (WAAPA) at Edith Cowan University (ECU) was established in 1980 to provide performing arts tuition. WAAPA (commonly pronounced "whopp-a") operates as a part of ECU, located at the ECU campus in Mount Lawley, a suburb in Perth, Western Australia.

Professor David Shirley is the Executive Dean of the Western Australian Academy of Performing Arts (WAAPA), at Edith Cowan University. Previously, holding posts as the Director of the Manchester School of Theatre and the Head of the School of Theatre at Rose Bruford College in Kent.

Courses
WAAPA provides courses in many fields of performing arts including acting, music theatre, directing, dance, jazz and contemporary music, classical music, performance making, arts management, production, and design. Broadcasting is now taught in the School of Communications and Arts of ECU. Originally an initiative of the state government, the Academy receives funding from both the State and Commonwealth governments.

Performance season
A further primary purpose of the academy is to stage concerts and performances, laying the path for students' transition to professional life.

Every year WAAPA stages hundreds of concerts and performances across the genres of jazz, contemporary and classical music, composition and music technology, dance, acting, and musical theatre.

Venues and facilities
The WAAPA buildings and facilities form part of the Edith Cowan University campus in Mount Lawley, a suburb in Perth, Western Australia.

The academy currently has eight public performance spaces. These include the Geoff Gibbs Theatre (a 270-seat proscenium arch theatre), the Roundhouse Theatre (a 130-seat court style theatre), the 165-seat Music Auditorium, an outdoor amphitheatre, Enright Studio, Dance Studios, and Jazz Studio.

Four more purpose built dance/rehearsal studio spaces were created: A recording studio, electronics studio, and four production workshops for design and costume making were also added to the existing workshops and behind the scenes production facilities.

Twelve large rehearsal and dance studios, numerous music and ensemble studios, a specialised visual and performing arts library collection, and numerous exhibition spaces.

Fully equipped broadcasting facilities and studios for television and radio. An environment has been created where broadcasting students can gain first hand experience of working within a media environment.

Academic appointments
Academic teaching appointments are made on the basis of qualifications, recent professional experience, industry profile, and reputation. WAAPA invites international professionals to Perth as artists in residence to work with students on productions and performances and to provide performance and professional advice through workshops. These have included New York saxophonist Jon Gordon and composer/arranger/guitarist Anthony Wilson.

Notable past teaching appointments include the Australian conductor of choral, orchestral, and operatic works, Richard Gill as dean of the Western Australian Conservatorium of Music from 1985 to 1990. When Gill moved to take up an appointment as Director of Chorus at Opera Australia, Edward Applebaum filled the appointment.

Notable alumni

 Hollie Andrew
 Luke Arnold
 Viva Bianca
 Andrew Bibby
 Shalom Brune-Franklin
 Jeremy Callaghan
 Jarrod Carland
 Vivien Carter
 Karina Carvalho
 Dustin Clare
 Sam Corlett
 Jai Courtney
 Martin Crewes
 Cassie Davis
 Charmaine Dragun
 Stella Donnelly
 Lucy Durack
 Georgie Gardner
 Mark Gasser
 Marcus Graham
 Kerrie Anne Greenland
 Georgina Haig
 Geraldine Hakewill
 Karla Hart
 Hugh Jackman
 Jim Jefferies
 Kate Jenkinson
 Hélène Joy
 Gerald Lepkowski
 Ewen Leslie
 Ben Lewis
 Meg Mac
 Tammy MacIntosh
 Suzie Mathers
 Ainsley Melham
 Jonathan Messer
 William McInnes
 Lisa McCune
 Tim Minchin
 Seann Miley Moore
 Dacre Montgomery
 Frances O'Connor
 Ben O'Toole
 Taryn Onafaro
 Paul Paddick
 Karin Page
 Nicholas Papademetriou
 Kevin Penkin
 Eddie Perfect
 Chris Piechocki
 Gemma Pranita
 Dominic Purcell
Daina Reid
 Matthew Lee Robinson
 Dana Rosendorff
 Gretel Scarlett
 Kris Stewart
 Pria Viswalingam
 Erica Wardle
 Nic Westaway

References

External links

 
Australian tertiary institutions
Universities in Western Australia
Film schools in Australia
Drama schools in Australia
Culture of Western Australia
Dance education in Australia
Edith Cowan University
Educational institutions established in 1980
Mount Lawley, Western Australia